Figgatta de Blanc is the tenth and final studio album by Italian rock band Elio e le Storie Tese, published in 2016.

The name is a parody of The Police's Reggatta de Blanc.

Track listing
"Figgatta de Blanc" – 0:49
"Vacanza alternativa" – 4:44
"She Wants" – 4:58
"Parla come mangi" – 5:49
"Il mistero dei bulli" – 5:17
"China disco bar" – 5:06
"Il quinto ripensamento" – 3:08
"Bomba intelligente" – 4:59
"Inquisizione" – 5:53
"Ritmo sbilenco" – 6:05
"Il rock della tangenziale" – 2:56
"Cameroon" – 4:10
"I delfini nuotano" – 5:38
"Il primo giorno di scuola" – 4:36
"Vincere l'odio" – 3:52

Charts

References

External links
 Figgatta de Blanc at the Elio e le Storie Tese official website

2016 albums
Elio e le Storie Tese albums
Italian-language albums